East Parish was created as a civil parish in Kings County, Prince Edward Island, Canada, during the 1764–1766 survey of Samuel Holland.

It contains the following townships:

 Lot 43
 Lot 44
 Lot 45
 Lot 46
 Lot 47

Parishes of Prince Edward Island
Geography of Kings County, Prince Edward Island